The 1922 Oklahoma gubernatorial election was held on November 7, 1922, and was a race for Governor of Oklahoma. Democrat  Jack C. Walton defeated Republican John Fields.  Also on the ballot was O. E. Enfield of the Socialist Party.

Democratic primary
Oklahoma City Mayor Jack Walton came out ahead of four others to claim the Democratic nomination for Governor.

Primary Results

Republican primary
John Fields defeated Geo. H. Healy to win the GOP nomination,

Results

Results

References

1922
Gubernatorial
Okla